Unnao district is a district of Uttar Pradesh state in northern India. The city of Unnao is the district headquarters. The district is part of Lucknow Division.

As of the 2011 census, Unnao district has a population of 3,108,367, making it the 31st-most populous district in Uttar Pradesh. It is a predominantly rural district, with over 80% of the population living in rural areas.

Unnao District is known as "The Land Of Pen and Sword" (कलम और तलवार की धरती).

History
Unnao district was created by the British upon their annexation of Oudh State in February 1856. Before then, under the Nawabs of Awadh, the area was divided between several different districts or : Purwa covered the eastern part, and to the north were Rasulabad and Safipur. The pargana of Auras, meanwhile, was part of the chakla of Sandila, and the parganas of Baiswara were included in the chakla of the same name, whose headquarters were at Rae Bareli. After the British takeover, the district was originally called "Purwa district" with Purwa as its headquarters. This only lasted for a very short period before the headquarters were relocated to Unnao.

Early
Xuanzang, the Chinese pilgrim to India, stayed at Kannauj for 3 months in 636 AD. From here he journeyed a distance of about 26 km and reached the city of Nafotipokulo (Navadevakula) which stood on the eastern bank of Ganga. The city was about 5 km in circumference and had a Deva Temple, several Buddhist monasteries and Stupas.

Navadevakula has been identified with Nawal, 18 miles southeast of Kannauj.

After that period, this area's history is almost completely obscure, with only the traditions of the later Rajput families as a source. These traditions indicate that today's Unnao district was heavily divided between various groups: the Bhars are said to have ruled in the eastern part, while the central part was inhabited by a mix of tribes including the Lodhs, Lunias, Ahirs, Thatheras, Dhobis, and Kurmis. The mud forts of their rulers are still pointed out, but none of them ruled over a very large area. In the north, the rulers were the Rajpasis, whose capital was the city of Ramkot (now known as Bangarmau). Finally, the area around Safipur was supposedly ruled by Brahmin rajas (Shukla), with Safipur originally being called "Saipur" after one of them.

Medieval
In the following centuries, the Rajputs were the main ruling class in this area. The Bais ruled in the south, the Dikshits were prevalent in the central part (their family traditions call this the "kingdom of Dikhitana"), and the north was divided between several smaller clans. Muslim rule was never very strong here, and so the medieval history of Unnao district is essentially a collection of separate family traditions of the ruling Rajput clans, with no specific dates given.

The first major Muslim center in the region was Bangarmau, around the year 1300: according to tradition, one Sayyid Ala-ud-Din conquered the area from the raja of Nawal, then destroyed Nawal and built a new capital at Bangarmau. The shrine over his grave bears an inscription with the date of 702 AH (1302 CE). The next major Muslim conquest was Safipur, said to have happened in 819 AH; a different Sayyid Ala-ud-Din was killed in battle here, and his shrine is venerated by both Hindus and Muslims. His son, Baha-ud-Din, is then said to have later conquered Unnao itself from the Bisen raja of the city, disguising his soldiers as women in order to take the raja's troops by surprise. Other Muslim outposts included Asiwan and Rasulabad.

At the time of Akbar, the entire area of modern Unnao district was included in the sarkar of Lucknow, in Awadh Subah. It consisted of the following mahals: Unnao (called Unam in the Ain-i-Akbari), Sarosi, Harha, Bangarmau, Safipur (then called Saipur), Fatehpur-Chaurasi, Mohan, Asiwan, Jhalotar, Parsandan, Unchgaon, Sidhupur, Purwa (then called Ranbhirpur), Mauranwan, Saron or Sarwan, Kumbhi, Magrayar, Panhan, Patan, Ghatampur, and finally Asoha. This administrative setup remained almost unaltered through the 20th century, although there were a few changes. For example, the pargana of Pariar was formed from parts of Sarosi and Safipur in 1785, and then in the 1800s the pargana of Sarosi became known as Sikandarpur instead (C.A. Elliott wrote in 1862 that it had "recently become habitual" at that time). As another example, Daundia Khera was formed out of Unchgaon and Sidhupur by Rao Mardan Singh around 1800.

Modern
There are few references to this area during the later Mughal period, but they become more numerous during under the Nawabs of Awadh. The Nawabs originally maintained a strong central authority over the region, with most of the local zamindars submitting to them without putting up a fight, but gradually their authority here diminished, and the local rulers became practically independent. Under the Nawabi administrative setup, the area covered by today's Unnao district was divided between several districts or : Purwa, Rasulabad, and Safipur were based here, while Sandila and Baiswara were based outside of the present district but included some of its territory.

When the British annexed Awadh in 1856, they established a new district based at Purwa, but the district headquarters were relocated to Unnao soon after. Unnao was chosen for its central location, and the Deputy Commissioner had been posted here even during the short time when Purwa was the headquarters And district kachhri in Tikargarhi village this located in central unnao area. At first, the new district was smaller than it is today, with only 13 parganas. In 1869, however, it became much larger: the 7 parganas of Baiswara (Panhan, Patan, Bihar, Bhagwantnagar, Magrayar, Ghatampur, and Daundia Khera) were transferred into Unnao district (from Rae Bareli district), where they became part of the tehsil of Purwa. Also in 1869, the pargana of Auras-Mohan was transferred here from Lucknow district, and Mohan became the seat of a tehsil (replacing Nawabganj).

Some fighting during 1857 sepoy mutiny took place in this area. Following the mutiny, the civil administration was re-established in the district which was named district Unnao, with headquarters at Unnao. The size of the district was however small until 1869, when it assumed its present form. The same year the town of Unnao was constituted a Municipality.

Economy
In 2006 the Ministry of Panchayati Raj named Unnao one of the country's 250 most backward districts (out of a total of 640). It is one of the 34 districts in Uttar Pradesh currently receiving funds from the Backward Regions Grant Fund Programme (BRGF).

Divisions

Unnao district is divided into 5 tehsils: Unnao, Hasanganj, Safipur, Purwa, and Bighapur. These are further subdivided into 16 community development blocks, as follows:

 Safipur tehsil:
 Ganj Moradabad block
 Bangarmau block
 Fatehpur Chaurasi block
 Safipur block
 Hasanganj tehsil:
 Auras block
 Mianganj block
 Hasanganj block
 Nawabganj block
 Unnao tehsil:
 Sikandarpur Sarausi block
 Bichhiya block
 Sikandarpur Karan block
 Purwa tehsil:
 Asoha block
 Purwa block
 Hilauli block
 Bighapur tehsil:
 Bighapur block
 Sumerpur block

The current elected representative from Unnao to the Lok Sabha, in the Parliament of India, is Shakshi Maharaj. The district had 6 Vidhan Sabha seats, namely Unnao, Purwa, Bhagwantnagar, Mohan, Safipur and Bangarmau. However, after delimitation in 2008, areas under Harha were merged with other Vidhan Sabha seats. Thus, the district now has only 6 Vidhan Sabha seats. Other prominent Qasba of Unnao include Karowan B.K., Safipur, Neotani, Asiwan, Bangarmau, Mohaan, Magarwara, Shuklaganj, Purwa Maurawan, and Baksar. The district magistrate is Ravindra Kumar.

The Unnao Lok Sabha Constituency had the largest number of registered voters for the 2009 Lok Sabha elections, post de-limitation, with about 1.9 million voters, making it India's largest parliamentary seat.

Member of Legislative Council—Kanpur Graduate Seat---Arun Pathak (BJP, elected 23/01/2015) (Kanpur city, Kanpur Dehat and Unnao districts are represented by this seat).

Municipalities
The district has 18 statutory towns, including 3 Nagar Palika Parishads (municipal boards) and 15 Nagar Panchayats, as listed below:

Unnao district also has 3 census towns, which are not full municipalities but are otherwise counted as urban areas:

Demographics

According to the 2011 census Unnao district has a population of 3,108,367, roughly equal to the nation of Mongolia or the US state of Iowa. This gives it a ranking of 31st in Uttar Pradesh and 112th in India (out of a total of 640). Its population growth rate over the decade 2001-2011 was 15.19%. The district's population is 82.9% rural and 17.1% urban as of 2011. Unnao district has a sex ratio of 906 females for every 1,000 males, which is the 30th-highest in the state. It also has a literacy rate of 66.4%, which is the 47th-highest in the state. Scheduled Castes made up 30.51% of the population.

Languages

At the time of the 2011 Census of India, 97.59% of the population in the district spoke Hindi (or a related language) and 2.25% Urdu as their first language.

Languages spoken here include Awadhi, a vernacular in the Hindi continuum spoken by over 38 million people, mainly in the Awadh region.

Education
The district follows the usual 10+2+3 pattern of education, as elsewhere in India. Some notable schools and institutions of the district are:
 Adarsh Vidya Mandir, Geeta Puram, Unnao
 Ben-Hur Inter College, Unnao
 Brilliant Academy Inter College, Unnao
 Government Inter College
 St. Jude's Inter College, Unnao
 St. Lawrence School
 Saraswati Vidya Mandir Inter College (S.V.M.I.C.), Pooran Nagar, Unnao
 Vivekanand Sarswati Shishu Mandir Inter College (V.S.S.M.I.C), Moti Nagar, Unnao

2013 gold treasure incident

In October 2013, Archaeological Survey of India took up the excavation near Daundia Khera village in Unnao district amid reports of over 1000 tonnes of gold deposits buried beneath the ruins of an old fort, which belonged to Ram Baksh Singh, a revolutionary of 1857. The preliminary investigation of ASI and GSI also confirmed a non-magnetic anomalous zone occurring at 5–20 m depth indicative of possible non-conducting, metallic contents and/or some alloys.

Notable personalities

 Gaya Prasad Shukla
 Uma Shankar Chaudhary

Notes

References

External links
 

 
Lucknow division
1869 establishments in India
Districts of Uttar Pradesh